Mikhail Tushmalov (1861–1896; also Tushmalishvili) was a Russian Georgian opera conductor who held posts in Warsaw and Tiflis (Tbilisi). He died in what is now the nation of Georgia.

Tushmalov is most widely discussed today as the first person to have prepared an orchestral version of Modest Mussorgsky's 1874 piano suite Pictures at an Exhibition. Tushmalov's version sets an abridged version of the piece. It may have been completed as early as 1886, when Tushmalov was a student of Rimsky-Korsakov. Reports circulate that Rimsky-Korsakov sketched the beginning of his own orchestration of Mussorgsky's piece, but abandoned the project when Tushmalov took up the task. The role possibly played by the teacher in shaping the orchestration by his student is not known.  The first performance of Tushmalov's orchestration was conducted by Rimsky-Korsakov in Saint Petersburg on November 30, 1891. The score was published by Bessel the same year and issued in a corrected edition sometime after Tushmalov's death. Tushmalov's orchestration has in recent years been reprinted by Kalmus.

Tushmalov's version of Mussorgsky's score is one of the least complete, as it omits 'Gnomus', 'Tuileries' and 'Bydlo' together with all the 'Promenades' except the fifth—which it puts in place of the first. Tushmalov's score is often described as dark and restrained in colour, and thus more authentically 'Russian' in its approach to the score than the later, more virtuosic orchestration by Ravel. Attributions for Tushmalov's setting often read 'Tushmalov/Rimsky-Korsakov', even though it is not established that his teacher contributed.

Tushmalov's version appears on audio in a performance by Mark Andreae and the Munich Philharmonic Orchestra. The attribution reads 'Tushmalov/Rimsky-Korsakov' for reasons that go unexplained in this specific case, though perhaps it is due to the story that Rimsky-Korsakov made edits to the Tushmalov orchestration in preparing it for the premiere.

Recordings

DC 22128 S Mussorgsky: Pictures at an Exhibition (orch. Tushmalov/Rimsky-Korsakov); Scherzo; Intermezzo in modo classico; Ceremonial March. Marc Andreae, Munich Philharmonic Orchestra. (Acanta Records, 1974)

1861 births
1896 deaths
Russian conductors (music)
Russian male conductors (music)
19th-century conductors (music)
19th-century male musicians